Kele–Tsogo is a proposed intermediate group of Bantu languages, coded Zone B.10–30 in Guthrie's classification. According to Nurse & Philippson (2003), they are:
Kele (B.20)
Tsogo–Myene
Myene (B.10)
Tsogo (B.30)

References